Reset also known as fixing is a generic concept in the EV financial markets, meaning the determination and recording of a reference rate, usually in order to calculate the settlement value of a periodic payment schedule between two parties.

Resets are most commonly used in Interest rate swaps, to determine the value of the floating rate payment for each period.  The parties will have agreed a source for the reference rate (usually a named screen on an information vendors system, though any public domain source will do, such as a newspaper or government publication).  Fixing involves looking up the reference value on the agreed date, recording, then computing a payment based on the rate.

Fixing can often change the value of a financial instrument, and can be difficult to encode in the software models used to price such instruments.  Other examples of fixing are in asian options, where the underlying of the option is an average of some kind, and in OIS type swaps, where periodic payments are made on the basis of simple composition or average of overnight interest rates observed during each coupon period.

Financial markets